The Macy conferences were a set of meetings of scholars from various academic disciplines held in New York under the direction of Frank Fremont-Smith at the Josiah Macy Jr. Foundation starting in 1941 and ending in 1960. The explicit aim of the conferences was to promote meaningful communication across scientific disciplines, and restore unity to science. There were different sets of conferences designed to cover specific topics, for a total of 160 conferences over the 19 years this program was active; the phrase "Macy conference" does not apply only to those on cybernetics, although it is sometimes used that way informally by those familiar only with that set of events. Disciplinary isolation within medicine was viewed as particularly problematic by the Macy Foundation, and given that their mandate was to aid medical research, they decided to do something about it. Thus other topics covered in different sets of conferences included: aging, adrenal cortex, biological antioxidants, blood clotting, blood pressure, connective tissues, infancy and childhood, liver injury, metabolic interrelations, nerve impulse, problems of consciousness, and renal function.

Overview 
The Josiah Macy, Jr. Foundation developed two innovations specifically designed to encourage and facilitate interdisciplinary and multidisciplinary exchanges; one was oral: the Macy conferences, and one was written: the Macy transactions (published transcriptions of the conferences). Macy conferences were essentially conversations held in a conference setting, with participants presenting research while it was still in process (rather than after it had been completed). These were more formal than conversations (papers were prepared ahead of time and circulated) but less formal than conferences. Macy transactions were transcriptions widely circulated to those who could not attend. These were far more informal than typical proceedings, which publish revised versions of conference papers, and served to invite additional scholars into the exchange. The explicit goal was to let a wider audience hear the experts exchange ideas and think out loud about their own work. But even participants themselves found the transactions valuable, as a way to prompt memories, and to catch comments they might have missed. A few comments were made explicitly referring to later publication of the conference discussions, so clearly participants took this into account. However, Fremont-Smith explicitly stated that actual discussion should always take priority.

Participants were leading scientists from a wide range of fields. Casual recollections of several participants as well as published comments in the Transactions volumes stress the communicative difficulties in the beginning of each set of conferences, giving way to the gradual establishment of a common language powerful enough to communicate the intricacies of the various fields of expertise present. Participants were deliberately chosen for their willingness to engage in interdisciplinary conversations, or for having formal training in multiple disciplines, and many brought relevant past experiences (gained either from earlier Macy conferences or other venues). As participants became more secure in their ability to understand one another over the course of a set of conferences on a single topic, their willingness to think outside their own specializations meant that creativity increased.

Conference topics

Cerebral Inhibition Meeting
The Macy Cybernetics Conferences were preceded by the Cerebral Inhibition Meeting, organized by Frank Fremont-Smith and Lawrence K. Frank, and held on 13–15 May 1942. Those invited were Gregory Bateson, Frank Beach, Carl Binger, Felix Deutsch, Flanders Dunbar, Julie Eisenbud, Carlyla Jacobsen, Lawrence Kubie, Jules Masserman, Margaret Mead, Warren McCulloch, Bela Mittelmann, David Rapoport, Arturo Rosenblueth, Donald Sheehan, Georg Soule, Robert White, John Whitehorn, and Harold Wolff. There were two topics:
 Hypnotism introduced by Milton Erickson
 Conditioned reflex introduced by Howard Liddell

Cybernetics Conferences
The Cybernetics conferences were held between 1946 and 1953, organized by the Josiah Macy, Jr. Foundation, motivated by Lawrence K. Frank and Frank Fremont-Smith of the Foundation. As chair of this set of conferences, Warren McCulloch had responsibility to ensure that disciplinary boundaries were not unduly respected. The Cybernetics were particularly complex as a result of bringing together the most diverse group of participants of any of the Macy conferences, so they were the most difficult to organize and maintain.

The principal purpose of these series of conferences was to set the foundations for a general science of the workings of the human mind. These were one of the first organized studies of interdisciplinarity, spawning breakthroughs in systems theory, cybernetics, and what later became known as cognitive science.

One of the topics spanning a majority of the conferences was reflexivity. Claude Shannon, one of the attendees, had previously worked on information theory and laid the one of the initial frameworks for the Cybernetic Conferences by postulating information as a probabilistic element which reduced the uncertainty from a set of choices (i.e. being told a statement is true, or even false, completely reduces the ambiguity of its message).

Other conference members, especially Donald MacKay, sought to reconcile Shannon's view of information, which they called selective information, with theirs of 'structural' information which signified how selective information was to be understood  (i.e. a true statement might acquire additional meanings in varied settings though the information exchanged itself has not changed). The addition of meaning into the concept of information necessarily brought the role of the observer into the Macy Conferences. MacKay argued that by receiving and interpreting a message, the observer and the information they perceived ceased to exist independently of one another. The individual reading and processing the information does so relative to their preexisting internal state, consisting of what they already know and have experienced, and only then acts.

MacKay further muddled the role of information and its meaning by introducing the idea of reflexivity and feedback loops into his thought experiment. By claiming that the influence of the original message on the initial observer could be perceived by a separate individual, MacKay turned the second individual into an additional observer which could be elicited to react just how the initial observer did, a reaction that could then further be observed by a nested doll of observers ad infinitum.

Reflexive feedback loops continued to come up during the Macy Conferences and became a prominent issue during its later discussions as well, most notably in the discussions regarding behavioral patterns of the human mind.

Warren McCulloch and Walter Pitts, also attendees, had previously worked on designing the first mathematical schema of a neuron based on the idea that each neuron had a threshold level that was to be reached, via excitation signals from incoming neurons, before firing its own signal onto others. Similarly to how Shannon had previously proven with his work in relay and switch circuits, McCulloch and Pitts proved that neural networks were capable of carrying out any boolean algebra calculations.

At the Macy Conferences, McCulloch proposed that the firing of a neuron can be associated with an event or interaction taking place in the external world which provides sensory stimulus that is then picked up by the nervous system and processed by the neurons. But McCulloch also showed how a neural network's signal pathway could be set up reflexively with itself causing the neurons to continuously fire onto each other in a 'reverberating' circular feedback loop without any original 'firing' signal or any new additional incoming signals. McCulloch claimed this accounted for conscious phenomena in which individuals' world view, or the reaffirmation of their senses' perceived external stimulus, was cognitively distorted or all together missing as seen in individuals with phantom limb syndrome (claiming to feel an arm that has been amputated or lost) or hallucinations (perceived sensory stimulus without an original external signal). Lawrence Kubie, another attending conference member and a psychiatrist, noted how repetitive and obsessive behaviors manifesting themselves in neurotics bore a resemblance to the behavior enacted by McCulloch's 'reverberating' loops.

Shannon had developed a maze-solving device which attendees of the Macy Conferences likened to a rat. Shannon's 'rat' was designed and programmed to find its marked goal when dropped at any point in a maze by giving it the ability to recall on past experiences, previous paths it had taken around the maze, so as to help it reach its endpoint - which it did repeatedly.

Though goal-oriented, Shannon showed how his rat's design was prone to erratic behavior that negated its original function entirely via reflexive feedback loops. If Shannon's rat encountered itself in a path in which its 'memory' failed to fire correctly, that is to recall the paths which lead it to its goal, it would get stuck in an endless loop chasing its tail. Completely abandoning its goal-oriented design, Shannon's rat had seemingly become neurotic.

The Macy Conferences failed to reconcile the subjectivity of information (its meaning) and that of the human mind but succeeding in showing how concepts such as that of the observer, reflexivity, black box systems, and neural networks would have to be approached in conjunction and eventually overcome in order to form a complete working theory of the mind. The Macy Conferences were discontinued shortly after the ninth conference.

First Cybernetics Conference, 21–22 March 1946
Second Cybernetics Conference, 17–18 October 1946
Third Cybernetics Conference, 13–14 March 1947
Fourth Cybernetics Conference, 23–24 October 1947
Fifth Cybernetics Conference, 18–19 March 1948
Sixth Cybernetics Conference, 24–25 March 1949
Seventh Cybernetics Conference, 23–24 March 1950
Eighth Cybernetics Conference, 15–16 March 1951
Ninth Cybernetics Conference, 20–21 March 1952
Tenth Cybernetics Conference, 22–24 April 1953

Participants: (as members or guests) in at least one of the Cybernetics conferences:
Harold Alexander Abramson, Ackerman, Vahe E. Amassian, William Ross Ashby, Yehoshua Bar-Hillel, Gregory Bateson, Alex Bavelas, Julian H. Bigelow, Herbert G. Birch, John R. Bowman, Henry W. Brosin, Yuen Ren Chao (who memorably recited the Lion-Eating Poet in the Stone Den), Jan Droogleever-Fortuyn, M. Ericsson, Fitch, Lawrence K. Frank, Ralph Waldo Gerard, William Grey Walter, Molly Harrower, George Evelyn Hutchinson, Heinrich Klüver, Lawrence S. Kubie, Paul Lazarsfeld, Kurt Lewin, J. C. R. Licklider, Howard S. Liddell, Donald B. Lindsley, W. K. Livingston, David Lloyd, Rafael Lorente de Nó, R. Duncan Luce, Donald M. MacKay, Donald G. Marquis, Warren S. McCulloch, Turner McLardy, Margaret Mead, Frederick A. Mettier, Marcel Monnier, Oskar Morgenstern, F. S. C. Northrop, Walter Pitts, Henry Quastler, Antoine Remond, I. A. Richards, David McKenzie Rioch, Arturo Rosenblueth, Leonard J. Savage, T. C. Schneirla, Claude Shannon, John Stroud, Hans-Lukas Teuber, Mottram Torre, Gerhardt von Bonin, Heinz von Foerster, John von Neumann, Heinz Werner, Norbert Wiener, Jerome B. Wiesner, J. Z. Young.

This is a sampling of the topics discussed each year.
1946, March (NYC)
 Self-regulating and teleological mechanisms
 Simulated neural networks emulating the calculus of propositional logic
 Anthropology and how computers might learn how to learn
 Object perception's feedback mechanisms
 Perceptual differences due to brain damage
 Deriving ethics from science
 Compulsive repetitive behavior

1946, October (NYC)
 Teleological mechanisms in society
 Concepts from Gestalt psychology
 Tactile and chemical communications among ant soldiers

1947, March (NYC)
 Child psychology

1947, October (NYC)
 The field perspective on psychology
 Analog vs. digital approaches to psychological models

1948, Spring (NYC)
 Formation of "I" in language
 Formal modeling applied to chicken pecking order formation

1949, March (NYC)
 Are the number of neurons and their connections sufficient to account for human capacities?
 Memory
 An appeal for collaboration between physics and psychology

1950, March (NYC)
 Analog vs. digital interpretations of the mind
 Language and Shannon's information theory
 Language, symbols and neurosis
 Intelligibility in speech communications
 A formal analysis of semantic redundancy in printed English

1951, March (NYC)
 Information as semantic
 Can automatons engage in deductive logic?
 Decision theory
 Feedforward
 Small group dynamics and group communications
 The applicability of game theory to psychic motivations
 The type of language needed to analyze language
 Mere behavior vs. true communication
 Is psychiatry scientific?
 Can a mental event that creates a memory ever be unconscious?

1952, March (NYC)
 The relation of neurophysiological details to broad issues in philosophy and epistemology
 The relation of cybernetics at the microlevel to biochemical and cellular processes
 The complexity of organisms as a function of information
 Humor, communication, and paradox
 Do chess playing automatons need randomness to defeat humans?
 Homeostasis and learning

1953, April (Princeton)
 Studies on the activity of the brain
 Semantic information and its measures
 Meaning in language and how its acquired
 How neural mechanisms can recognize shapes and musical chords
 What consensus, if any, the Macy Conferences have arrived at

Some of the researchers present at the cybernetics conferences later went on to do extensive government-funded research on the psychological effects of LSD, and its potential as a tool for interrogation and psychological manipulation in such projects as the CIA's MKULTRA program.

Neuropharmacological Conferences
First Neuropharmacological Conference, 26–28 May 1954
Participants:
William Borberg, Seymour Kety, Ernest Sharrer, Mary Brazier, Horace Magoun, Carl Pfieffer
Topics:
LSD

Group Processes Conferences
The Group Processes Conferences were held between 1954 and 1960. They are of particular interest due to the element of reflexivity: participants were interested in their own functioning as a group, and made numerous comments about their understanding of how Macy conferences were designed to work. For example, there were a series of jokes made about the disease afflicting them all, interdisciplinitis., or how multidisciplinarian researchers were neither fish nor fowl. When Erving Goffman made a guest appearance at the Third conference, he explicitly prefaced his comments by saying that his ideas were partly speculative, and Frank Fremont-Smith responded by stating that their goal was to discuss ideas that had not been crystallized.

First Group Processes Conference, 26–30 September 1954
Second Group Processes Conference, 9–12 October 1955
Third Group Processes Conference, 7–10 October 1956
Fourth Group Processes Conference, 13–16 October 1957
Fifth Group Processes Conference, 12–15 October 1960

Participants: (as members or guests) in at least one of the Group Processes conferences:
Grace Baker, Donald H. Barron, Gregory Bateson, Alex Bavelas, Frank A. Beach, Leo Berman, Ray L. Birdwhistell, Robert L. Blake, Helen Blauvelt, Jerome S. Bruner, George W. Boguslavsky, Charlotte Bühler, Eliot D. Chapple, Stanley Cobb, Nicholas E. Collias, Jocelyn Crane, Erik H. Erikson, L. Thomas Evans, Jerome Frank, Frank S. Freeman, Frieda Fromm-Reichmann, Erving Goffman, Arthur D. Hasler, Eckhard H. Hess, Sol Kramer, Daniel S. Lehrman, Seymour Levy, Howard Liddell, Robert Jay Lifton, Margarethe Lorenz, Konrad Z. Lorenz, William D. Lotspeich, Ernst Mayr, Margaret Mead, Joost A. M. Meerloo, I. Arthur Mirsky, Horst Mittelstaedt, A. Ulric Moore, R. C. Murphy, Harris B. Peck, Karl H. Pribram, Fritz Redl, Julius B. Richmond, Bertram Schaffner, T. C. Schneirla, Theodore Schwartz, William J. L. Sladen, Robert J. Smith, John P. Spiegel, H. Burr Steinbach, Niko Tinbergen, Mottram P. Torre, William Grey Walter, E. P. Wheeler, II.

See also 
 Complex systems
 Cybernetics
 Integrative learning
 Josiah Macy, Jr. Foundation
 Second-order cybernetics

References

Further reading 
 
 Heims, S. J. (1991). The cybernetics group. Cambridge, MA: MIT Press.
 
 Pias, C. (Ed.). (2003). Cybernetics – Kybernetik. The Macy-Conferences 1946-1953. Zürich/Berlin : diaphanes.
 Schaffner, B. (Ed.). (1959). Group processes: Transactions of the fourth conference. New York: Josiah Macy, Jr. Foundation.
 Schaffner, B. (Ed.). (1960). Group processes: Transactions of the fifth conference. New York: Josiah Macy, Jr. Foundation.
 von Foerster, H., Mead, M., & Teuber, H. L. (Eds.). (1953). Cybernetics: Circular causal and feedback mechanisms in biological and social systems. Transactions of the ninth Conference. New York: Josiah Macy, Jr. Foundation.

External links
 The Josiah Macy, Jr. Foundation

Cybernetics
Academic conferences
Systems theory
Systems sciences organizations
Josiah Macy Jr. Foundation